Comitas elegans is a species of sea snail, a marine gastropod mollusc in the family Pseudomelatomidae, the turrids and allies

Description

Distribution
This marine species occurs in the Gulf of Aden.

References

 Sysoev, A. V. "Deep-sea conolidean gastropods collected by the John Murray Expedition, 1933–34." Bulletin of the Natural History Museum, Zoology Series 62 (1996): 1–30.

External links
 
 Biolib.cz: Comitas elegans

elegans
Gastropods described in 1996